Willow Village is a proposed neighborhood in Menlo Park, California adjacent to the Facebook campus. The entire area is owned by Facebook, which it seeks to develop. The neighborhood is proposed to have 1.75 million square feet of office space, 1,500 apartments, 125,000-square feet of retail, a 200-room hotel, a visitor center, and 5,319 parking spaces.

Further reading

References

Facebook
Menlo Park, California